The 1965–66 NBA season was the Hawks' 17th season in the NBA and 11th season in St. Louis.

Regular season

Season standings

Record vs. opponents

Game log

Playoffs

|- align="center" bgcolor="#ccffcc"
| 1
| March 24
| @ Baltimore
| W 113–111
| Joe Caldwell (33)
| Bill Bridges (19)
| Richie Guerin (12)
| Baltimore Civic Center3,587
| 1–0
|- align="center" bgcolor="#ccffcc"
| 2
| March 27
| @ Baltimore
| W 105–100
| Richie Guerin (25)
| Bill Bridges (19)
| Richie Guerin (8)
| Baltimore Civic Center13,104
| 2–0
|- align="center" bgcolor="#ccffcc"
| 3
| March 30
| Baltimore
| W 121–112
| Bill Bridges (32)
| Bill Bridges (20)
| Lenny Wilkens (10)
| Kiel Auditorium7,135
| 3–0
|-

|- align="center" bgcolor="#ffcccc"
| 1
| April 1
| @ Los Angeles
| L 106–129
| Beaty, Guerin (22)
| Zelmo Beaty (14)
| Richie Guerin (8)
| Los Angeles Memorial Sports Arena11,509
| 0–1
|- align="center" bgcolor="#ffcccc"
| 2
| April 3
| @ Los Angeles
| L 116–125
| Zelmo Beaty (36)
| Bill Bridges (16)
| Lenny Wilkens (9)
| Los Angeles Memorial Sports Arena14,896
| 0–2
|- align="center" bgcolor="#ccffcc"
| 3
| April 6
| Los Angeles
| W 120–113
| Bill Bridges (27)
| Bill Bridges (17)
| Richie Guerin (8)
| Kiel Auditorium8,318
| 1–2
|- align="center" bgcolor="#ffcccc"
| 4
| April 9
| Los Angeles
| L 95–107
| Zelmo Beaty (22)
| Zelmo Beaty (19)
| Richie Guerin (7)
| Kiel Auditorium9,569
| 1–3
|- align="center" bgcolor="#ccffcc"
| 5
| April 10
| @ Los Angeles
| W 112–100
| Lenny Wilkens (29)
| Zelmo Beaty (19)
| Lenny Wilkens (12)
| Los Angeles Memorial Sports Arena14,297
| 2–3
|- align="center" bgcolor="#ccffcc"
| 6
| April 13
| Los Angeles
| W 127–131
| Bill Bridges (29)
| Bridges, Beaty (11)
| Richie Guerin (11)
| Kiel Auditorium8,614
| 3–3
|- align="center" bgcolor="#ffcccc"
| 7
| April 15
| @ Los Angeles
| L 121–130
| Cliff Hagan (29)
| Bill Bridges (13)
| Richie Guerin (5)
| Los Angeles Memorial Sports Arena15,200
| 3–4
|-

References

Atlanta Hawks seasons
St. Louis
St. Louis Hawks
St. Louis Hawks